Líneas Aéreas Federales was a state-owned airline operating domestic services based in Buenos Aires, Argentina. Its flights were operated by other local airlines.

History

The airline was established in 2003 and started operations on October 2, 2003. It was created by the Argentinian government after Líneas Aéreas Privadas Argentinas (LAPA) was folded. It was owned by the Federal planning ministry (40%), ministry of economy (40%) and Intercargo (20%).

This airline was created in 2003 to absorb the workers of two small bankrupt private airlines, LAPA and Dinar Líneas Aéreas. The company does not actually have any planes of its own. Later on it helped Southern Winds Airlines, another private carrier, to keep afloat by providing its routes and staff in exchange for using Southern Winds' fleet. Southern Winds continued to fly under their colours. Yet another Argentine airline, Aerovip, was also absorbed over those same years.

In March 2005, the Chilean flagship airline LAN Airlines reached an agreement with the Argentine government to absorb all workers at Argentina's state carrier LAFSA. LAN took over LAFSA's routes and agreed to help Southern Winds for at least 90 days as well. It was at this point that LAN Argentina began. Since then, Southern Winds completely disappeared, with LAN Argentina replacing LAFSA and Southern Winds.

The remarkable fact is that LAFSA never had any airplanes, but it would keep the structure that was not absorbed by LAN Argentina, even with people in charge with clients, a marketing manager, pilots and copilots.

See also
List of defunct airlines of Argentina

References

Defunct airlines of Argentina
Airlines established in 2003
Airlines disestablished in 2005
2005 disestablishments in Argentina
Argentine companies established in 2003